Reda El-Batoty (born 8 August 1963) is an Egyptian weightlifter. He competed at the 1988 Summer Olympics and the 1992 Summer Olympics.

References

1963 births
Living people
Egyptian male weightlifters
Olympic weightlifters of Egypt
Weightlifters at the 1988 Summer Olympics
Weightlifters at the 1992 Summer Olympics
Place of birth missing (living people)
20th-century Egyptian people
21st-century Egyptian people